is a Japanese tokusatsu drama produced by Tsuburaya Productions, as well as the 34th entry to the Ultraman Series and the fourth in the Reiwa era. Decker serves as the sequel to Ultraman Trigger: New Generation Tiga and celebrating the 25th anniversary of Ultraman Dyna. The series aired on TV Tokyo on July 9, 2022.

Synopsis

Ultraman Decker takes place years after the end of Ultraman Trigger: New Generation Tiga, where Earth has entered a period of peace once again. When humanity begins their outer space exploration program and their monster attack countermeasures diminish at the same time, the Spheres launch their attacks, causing Earth to be desolated from the rest of the solar system.

A store worker named Kanata Asumi obtains the Ultra D Flasher and becomes Ultraman Decker, using his newfound powers to repel the invading Sphere assaults. After a one year period of training, Kanata gets enlisted into GUTS-Select, consists of the captain Taiji Murahoshi, Nursedessei operator Sawa Kaizaki, space exploratory artificial intelligence HANE2 and fellow TPU graduates Soma Ryumon and Ichika Kirino. In addition, Kanata/Decker obtains occassional help from Kengo Manaka/Ultraman Trigger, who was actively defending the Mars civilization from the remaining Sphere platoon. Late into the series, TPU's researcher Yuichiro Asakage reveals himself as Agams the Bazdo, an alien from the future who was responsible for the Sphere's invasion on Earth, doing so to prevent their invasion on Planet Bazdo and the death of his wife, Laelia, from ever happening. Decker Asumi, the true owner of Ultraman Decker's powers, try to reclaim his mantle but finally puts his trust on his Kanata to continue his fight after seeing his ancestor obtaining Dynamic Type.

As the series approaching its end, Agams begins taking an active role in the frontlines by shrinking the Sphere Barrier and summoning the Mother Spheresaurus, the Sphere's progenitor, to escalate the end of Planet Earth. A visit from Laelia's spirit manages to redeem Agams at the last minute before his death, but fails to stop Mother Spheresaurus from absorbing the energies from Eternity Core. Kengo/Trigger offers his help by siphoning the energy from Mother Spheresaurus to Kanata/Decker, who channels it in his final attack that kills the monster. Mother Spheresaurus' death results with the Spheres' total annihilation, as well as Earth finally reestablishing contact with outer space.

Production
Ultraman Decker and the titular Ultra were first announced by Tsuburaya Productions at the end of Ultraman Trigger: Episode Z as a post-credit scene. The show was later officially announced on March 31, 2022. As with Ultraman Trigger: New Generation Tiga, Decker continues to celebrate the TDG Heisei Trilogy series that consists of Ultraman Tiga, Dyna and Gaia, hence Decker itself representing Dyna as its modern-day retelling of the series. In addition, Hironobu Kageyama sings the ending theme, Kanata Tōku, returning exactly 25 years after performing for the second ending theme of Dyna.

According to director Takesue, while Decker inherited many aspects from Dyna, he aims to take the show's direction to a different approach from its source of inspiration. As such, the titular Ultra has his Color Timer's positioning at the left side of his pectoral and his chest bearing the image of the universe, but his overall design and silhouette is an attempt at returning to the image of Heisei era Ultras as a whole. In addition, the theme of the series is "future", as Decker focuses on what lies ahead in contrast of Triggers themes of ancient era. Ultraman Decker is considered as the tenth entry to the  series lineup that was introduced since Ultraman Ginga. In addition, the series' charm is to "make new ones", hence the show will be expected to introduce more new monsters in its run.

According to Hiroki Matsumoto, filming of Ultraman Decker started in December 2021.

Episodes 
At the end of each episode, a minisode called  aired and featuring Kanata Asumi describing the Dimension Cards of said episode. HANE2 joined Kanata starting from episode 2 onwards.

Spin-off program
 is a Tsuburaya Imagination-exclusive spin-off program released on October 1, 2022. In addition to Masamichi Hotta and Marluru reappearing, each episode also features one of the members of the reformed GUTS-Select.

Ultraman Decker Finale: Journey to Beyond
 is an upcoming film exclusively for pay per view content in Tsuburaya Imagination, set to air on February 23, 2023. The movie takes place after the end of Ultraman Decker and features former AKB48 member  as a guest actress.

Cast
/: 
: 
: 
: 
: 
: 
HANE2 (Voice): 
Ultra D Flasher announcement, Narrator (SPs):

Guest cast

: 
: 
: M・A・O
/: 
, : 
: 
: 
: 
: 
: 
: 
:

Songs
Opening theme
"Wake up Decker!"
Lyrics: 
Composition & Arrangement: 
Artist: SCREEN mode
Episodes: 1-13 (Verse 1), 14-24 (Verse 2)
In episode 25, this song is used as an insert song.

Ending themes

Arrangement: 
Lyrics, Composition, & Artist: 
Episodes: 1-13

Arrangement: 
Lyrics, Composition, & Artist: Hironobu Kageyama
Episodes: 14-25

International broadcast
In Hong Kong, this series aired on ViuTV on October 8, 2022.

In Malaysia, this series aired on Astro Ceria on November 8, 2022, with Malay dubbed.

See also
Ultra Series – Complete list of official Ultraman-related shows

References

External links
Ultraman Decker at Tsuburaya Productions 
Ultraman Decker at TV Tokyo 

2022 Japanese television series debuts
Ultra television series
TV Tokyo original programming